Osroene, also spelled  Osrohene and Osrhoene, was a Roman province which existed for nearly 400 years. It was formed after the absorption of the Kingdom of Osroene in 214 CE  and served as a frontier province against the Sassanid Empire until the Muslim conquests of the 7th century.

For the whole of its existence, the province would remain a bone of contention between the Romans and their eastern neighbors, the Sassanid Persians, suffering heavily in the recurrent Roman–Persian Wars. War broke out after the death of the Roman emperor Decius in 251 and the province was invaded by the Persians. In the second half of the 250s, the Persian shah Shapur I (r. ca. 240–270) attacked the Roman east, which was defended by the Roman emperor Valerianus (r. 253–260), whom he captured at Edessa in 260. In the next year however, Shapur was heavily defeated by Odaenathus of Palmyra and driven out of Osroene and Mesopotamia.

It was taken and retaken several times. Being a province on the frontier it had a Roman legion stationed there, Legio III Parthica and its Castrum (homebase) was Resaena though there are some doubts on that fact.

Since Emperor Diocletian's Tetrarchy reforms  during his reign 284–305 CE, it was part of the diocese of Oriens, in the praetorian prefecture of the same name. According to the late 4th-century Notitia Dignitatum, it was headed by a governor of the rank of praeses, and was also the seat of the dux Mesopotamiae, who ranked as vir spectabilis and commanded (c. 400) the following army units:
Equites Dalmatae Illyriciani, garrisoned at Ganaba.
Equites Promoti Illyriciani, Callinicum.
Equites Mauri Illyriciani, Dabana.
Equites Promoti indigenae, Banasam
Equites Promoti indigenae, Sina Iudaeorum.
Equites Sagittarii indigenae, Oraba.
Equites Sagittarii indigenae, Thillazamana.
Equites Sagittarii indigenae Medianenses, Mediana.
Equites Primi Osrhoeni, Rasin.
Praefectus legionis quartae Parthicae, Circesium.
(an illegible command, possibly Legio III Parthica), Apatna.
as well as, 'on the minor roll', apparently auxiliaries:
Ala Septima Valeria Praelectorum, Thillacama.
Ala Prima Victoriae, Tovia -contra Bintha.
Ala Secunda Paflagonum, Thillafica.
Ala Prima Parthorum, Resaia.
Ala Prima nova Diocletiana, inter Thannurin et Horobam.
Cohors Prima Gaetulorum, Thillaamana.
Cohors Prima Eufratensis, Maratha.
Ala Prima Salutaria, Duodecimo constituta.

References

Sources

 
 
 
 
 
 
 
 
 
 
 
 

Late Roman provinces
Provinces of the Byzantine Empire